Summit County is an urban county in the U.S. state of Ohio. As of the 2020 census, the population was 540,428, making it the fourth-most populous county in Ohio. Its county seat and largest city is Akron. The county was formed on March 3, 1840, from portions of Medina, Portage and Stark Counties. It was named Summit County because the highest elevation on the Ohio and Erie Canal is located in the county.

Summit County is part of the Akron, OH Metropolitan Statistical Area, which is also included in the Cleveland-Akron-Canton, OH Combined Statistical Area.

Geography
The largest portion of Cuyahoga Valley National Park is located in the northern part of the county. The southern border of the former Connecticut Western Reserve passes through the southern part of the county, leading to jogs in the east and west borders of the county.

Major highways

Adjacent counties
 Cuyahoga County - northwest
 Geauga County - northeast
 Portage County - east
 Stark County - south
 Wayne County - southwest
 Medina County - west

National protected area
 Cuyahoga Valley National Park (also extends north into Cuyahoga County)

Government

Summit County, along with Cuyahoga County, is one of two of Ohio's 88 counties that have a charter government, as authorized by Article X of the Ohio Constitution. Under its charter, rather than three elected commissioners, Summit County has an elected County Executive and an eleven-member County Council. Eight members of the council are elected from individual districts; the other three are elected at large. Summit County also has an appointed Medical Examiner rather than an elected Coroner, and an elected Fiscal Officer, who exercises the powers and performs the duties of a county auditor, treasurer and recorder. The remaining officials are similar to the officials in other counties. They include the following:

 Clerk of Courts - Sandra Kurt (D) (elected)
 Prosecuting Attorney - Sherri Bevan Walsh (D) (elected)
 Engineer - Alan Brubaker (D) (elected)
 Sheriff - Kandy Fatheree (D) (elected)
 Fiscal Officer - Kristen Scalise (D) (elected)
Summit County currently has 14 Common Pleas judges. They are:
 Kelly McLaughlin (D),
 Kathryn Michael (D),
 Christine Croce (R),
 Jennifer Towell (D), 
 Alison McCarty (R),
 Tammy O'Brien (R),
 Joy Oldfield (D),
 Mary Margaret Rowlands (D),
 Alison Breaux (D)
 Susan Baker Ross (D)
 Linda Tucci Teodosio (D) (Juvenile Court Judge)
 Katarina Cook (R) (Domestic Relations Judge)
 Kani Hightower (D) (Domestic Relations Judge)  
 Elinore Marsh Stormer (D) (Probate Judge)

Summit County Council
Summit County has an 11-member council. Three members are elected at-large in mid-term cycles, while eight members are elected from districts coinciding with the Presidential election. The current members of Summit County Council are:
 Erin Dickinson (D) (at-large)
 Elizabeth Walters (D) (at-large) 
 John Donofrio (D) (at-large)
 Rita Darrow (D) (District 1)
 John Schmidt (D) (District 2)
 Gloria Rodgers (R) (District 3)
 Jeff Wilhite (D) (District 4) 
 Veronica Sims (D) (District 5) 
 Christine Higham (D) (District 6) 
 Beth McKenney (R) (District 7)
 Anthony Devitis (R) (District 8)

* Indicates Council President

County Executives
 John R. Morgan, 1981–1989
 Tim Davis, 1989–2001
 James B. McCarthy (D), 2001–2007
 Russell M. Pry (D), 2007-2016
 Ilene Shapiro (D), 2016–present

Politics
Like much of Northeast Ohio, Summit is heavily Democratic. It has only voted Republican three times since 1932, all in national Republican landslides– Dwight D. Eisenhower's 1956 victory, and the 49-state sweeps by Richard Nixon and Ronald Reagan in 1972 and 1984, respectively. It has been trending more Republican in recent years, however, with Republican candidate Donald Trump obtaining 43% of the vote in 2016 and increasing his percentage in 2020, keeping the Democratic margin below ten percent for the first time since 1988 and also being the two highest Republican percentages since then.

|}

Demographics

2010 census
As of the 2010 Census, there were 541,781 people, 222,781 households, and 141,110 families residing in the county. The racial makeup of the county was 80.6% white, 14.4% black or African American, 2.2% Asian, 0.2% American Indian, 0.5% from other races, and 2.1% from two or more races. Those of Hispanic or Latino origin made up 1.6% of the population. In terms of ancestry, 24.9% were German, 15.3% were Irish, 10.6% were English, 10.1% were Italian, 5.1% were Polish, and 4.5% were American.

Of the 222,781 households, 29.8% had children under the age of 18 living with them, 45.3% were married couples living together, 13.6% had a female householder with no husband present, 36.7% were non-families, and 30.0% of all households were made up of individuals. The average household size was 2.39 and the average family size was 2.98. The median age was 40.0 years.

The median income for a household in the county was $47,926 and the median income for a family was $62,271. Males had a median income of $47,892 versus $35,140 for females. The per capita income for the county was $26,676. About 10.0% of families and 13.8% of the population were below the poverty line, including 19.8% of those under age 18 and 8.0% of those age 65 or over.

Education

School districts
School districts in Ohio do not strictly follow city corporation limits or township borders. Many of the school districts in Summit County overlap community borders.  Below is a list of all public school districts in the county.
 Akron Public School District
 Revere Local School District
 Copley–Fairlawn City School District
 Woodridge Local School District
 Hudson City School District
 Stow-Munroe Falls City School District
 Cuyahoga Falls City School District
 Tallmadge City School District
 Mogadore Local School District
 Springfield Local School District
 Coventry Local School District
 Green Local School District
 Manchester Local School District
 Barberton City School District
 Norton City School District
 Twinsburg City School District
 Nordonia Hills City School District

Colleges and universities
 University of Akron, Akron
 Kent State University Twinsburg Academic Center, Twinsburg
 Stark State College Akron

Recreation
 Summit Metro Parks

Communities

Cities
 Akron (county seat)
 Barberton
 Cuyahoga Falls
 Fairlawn
 Green
 Hudson
 Macedonia
 Munroe Falls
 New Franklin
 Norton (partly in Wayne County)
 Reminderville
 Stow
 Tallmadge
 Twinsburg

Villages

 Boston Heights
 Clinton
 Lakemore
 Mogadore
 Northfield
 Peninsula
 Richfield
 Silver Lake

Townships

 Bath
 Boston
 Copley
 Coventry
 Northfield Center
 Richfield
 Sagamore Hills
 Springfield
 Twinsburg

Defunct townships

 Franklin
 Green
 Hudson
 Norton
 Northampton
 Portage
 Stow

Census-designated places

 Montrose-Ghent
 Pigeon Creek
 Portage Lakes
 Sawyerwood
 Twinsburg Heights

Unincorporated communities

 Bath
 Boston
 Botzum
 Brandywine
 Comet
 Copley
 Everett
 Ghent
 Greensburg
 Montrose
 Myersville
 Western Star

See also
 National Register of Historic Places listings in Summit County, Ohio

References

External links
 Official Summit County page
 Akron-Summit Convention and Visitors Bureau
 Summit Memory, an online scrapbook capturing the history of Summit County, Ohio by the Akron-Summit County Public Library

 
1840 establishments in Ohio
Populated places established in 1840